The 1909–10 Ohio Bobcats men's basketball team represented Ohio University. James C. Jones returned as the head coach for the third year of the program and played their home games in Ohio Gymnasium.

Schedule

|-
!colspan=9 style=| Regular Season

References

 Ohio Record Book
 Ohio Basketball at 100

Ohio Bobcats men's basketball seasons
Ohio
Ohio Bobcats
Ohio Bobcats